Colditz is a city in Saxony, Germany.

Colditz may also refer to:

 The Colditz Story, a 1955 film starring John Mills and Eric Portman
 Colditz (1972 TV series), a 1972–74 BBC television series
 Colditz (2005 TV series), a 2005 two-part television film starring Damian Lewis
 Colditz (audio drama), a Doctor Who audio drama
 Colditz Castle, founded in 1158 and used as a prisoner-of-war camp during World War II
 Colditz Cock, a glider built by British prisoners of war for an escape attempt from Colditz Castle during World War II
 Escape from Colditz, a board game manufactured by Parker Bros.